Square Crooks is a 1928 American silent comedy drama film directed by Lewis Seiler and starring Robert Armstrong, Johnny Mack Brown and Dorothy Dwan. The screenplay is based on the 1926 play Square Crooks by James P. Judge. The screenplay was rewritten and made as the sound film Baby Take a Bow in 1934.

Premise
After being released from jail, two former criminals attempt to go straight. They manages to land jobs as chauffeurs for a wealthy family, but a vindictive detective is not convinced they have given up crime and tries to arrest them for stealing jewels.

Cast
 Robert Armstrong as Eddie Ellison  
 Johnny Mack Brown as Larry Scott  
 Dorothy Dwan as Jane Brown  
 Dorothy Appleby as Kay Ellison  
 Eddie Sturgis as Mike Ross 
 Clarence Burton as Harry Welsh  
 Jackie Combs as Phillip Carson

References

Bibliography
 Solomon, Aubrey. The Fox Film Corporation, 1915-1935: A History and Filmography. McFarland, 2011.

External links

1928 films
1928 comedy-drama films
Films directed by Lewis Seiler
American silent feature films
Fox Film films
American films based on plays
American black-and-white films
1920s English-language films
1920s American films
Silent American comedy-drama films